Nemophora ochsenheimerella is a moth of the family Adelidae. It is a trans-Palearctic species, which is also found in Central Europe.

The moth flies in one generation from late April to June.

Notes
The flight season refers to Belgium and The Netherlands. This may vary in other parts of the range.

External links
Microlepidoptera.nl 
 Lepidoptera of Belgium

Adelidae
Moths of Japan
Moths of Europe
Taxa named by Jacob Hübner